Return of the Brecker Brothers is an album by the American jazz fusion group, the Brecker Brothers. It was released by GRP Records in 1992, their first recording after a decade-long hiatus. The track "Big Idea" was released as an R&B single.

Reception 
AllMusic awarded the album with 3.5 stars and its review by Thom Jurek states: "This set marked a fitting return for the Breckers, who never let the fashionable tenets of the smooth jazz '90s totally appropriate their creativity or their sound". At the 1993 Grammy Awards the album received three nominations: Best Contemporary Jazz Album, Best R&B Instrumental Performance ("Big Idea") and Best Jazz Instrumental Solo (Randy Brecker on "Above & Below").

Track listing 
 "Song for Barry" (Michael Brecker) — 5:07
 "King of the Lobby" (Michael Brecker) — 5:20
 "Big Idea" (Michael Brecker, Randy Brecker, Robbie Kilgore) — 4:20
 "Above & Below" (Randy Brecker) — 7:05
 "That’s All There Is to It" (Randy Brecker) — 5:26
 "Wakaria (What’s Up?)" (Michael Brecker) — 5:26
 "On the Backside" (Michael Brecker, Randy Brecker) — 6:25
 "Sozinho (Alone)" (Randy Brecker) — 7:36
 "Spherical" (Michael Brecker) — 5:58
 "Good Gracious" (Randy Brecker) — 5:13
 "Roppongi" (Randy Brecker) — 4:56

Personnel 

The Brecker Brothers
 Michael Brecker – tenor saxophone, Akai EWI (1, 6, 11), keyboards (1, 2, 9), synthesizer programming (1, 2, 6, 9), arrangements (1, 2, 5, 7, 9), soprano saxophone (6)
 Randy Brecker – trumpet (1-7, 9, 10, 11), flugelhorn (1, 2, 6, 8), arrangements (4, 5, 7, 8, 10, 11), vocals (5)

Other Musicians
 Max Risenhoover – synthesizer programming (1, 2), percussion programming (1), bass (2), drums (2), arrangements (2), snare drum programming (6), ride cymbal (6), cymbals (8)
 George Whitty – keyboards (1, 2, 4, 5, 6, 8-11), additional Rhodes piano (3), arrangements (5, 9), acoustic piano (7), programming (7), additional arrangements (7), synthesizer programming (9, 11)
 Mary "Maz" Kessler – keyboards (3, 7), drum programming (3, 7), arrangements (3)
 Robbie Kilgore – Rhodes piano (3), bass (3), arrangements (3), additional acoustic piano (7), synth bass (7)
 Mike Stern – guitars (1, 2, 4, 8-11)
 Dean Brown – guitars (2, 5, 11)
 Armand Sabal-Lecco – bass (1, 5, 6), piccolo bass (1, 6), vocals (1, 6), drums (6), percussion (6), arrangements (6)
 James Genus – bass (4, 10, 12), acoustic bass (7, 8), electric bass (8)
 Dennis Chambers – drums (4, 5, 6, 8-11)
 Don Alias – percussion (1, 8, 9, 11)
 Bashiri Johnson – percussion (4)
 David Sanborn – alto saxophone (2)
 Jason Miles – arrangements (2)
 Veera – voices (2, 3)
 Will Lee – additional voices (5), bass (9)
 Malcolm Pollack – additional voices (5)

Production 
 Dave Grusin – executive producer 
 Larry Rosen – executive producer 
 The Brecker Brothers – producers (1, 2, 4-11)
 Maz & Kilgore – producers (3, 7), mixing (7)
 Max Risenhoover – co-producer, editing, sequencing
 George Whitty – co-producer 
 Todd Childress – engineer, assistant engineer 
 Malcolm Pollack – engineer 
 Garry Rindfuss – engineer 
 Michael White – engineer, assistant engineer 
 Jenny Bette – assistant engineer 
 Brian Kinkead – assistant engineer 
 Lolly Grodner – assistant engineer 
 Ray Bardani – mixing (1, 2, 3)
 Joe Ferla – mixing (4, 5, 6, 8-11)
 Joseph Doughney – post-production engineer 
 Michael Landy – post-production engineer 
 Adam Zelinda – post-production engineer 
 Greg Calbi – mastering at Sterling Sound (New York, NY)
 Kyle Benson – A&R 
 Cameron Mizell – production coordinator 
 Hollis King – art direction
 Scott Johnson – design 
 Sonny Mediana – design
 Andy Ruggirello – design 
 Dan Serrano – design 
 Sharon Franklin – design assistant 
 Darryl Pitt – cover concept, photography 
 Judith Schiller – photography

Return of the Brecker Brothers – Live in Barcelona (VHS)

In 1992, a VHS video entitled "Return of the Brecker Brothers – Live in Barcelona" was released by GRP Records of a concert at the Palau de la Música Catalana in Barcelona. The concert has not officially been released on DVD format. It was officially released on Laser disk however. (GRP Video – PILJ-1124)

Track listing
 "Above & Below" (Randy Brecker)
 "Spherical" (Michael Brecker)
 "Some Skunk Funk" (Randy Brecker)
 "Common Ground" (Mike Stern)
 "Song for Barry" (Michael Brecker)
 "Inside Out" (Randy Brecker)

Personnel 
 Michael Brecker – tenor saxophone, EWI
 Randy Brecker – trumpet
 George Whitty – keyboards
 Mike Stern – guitars
James Genus – bass
 Dennis Chambers – drums

References

1992 albums
Brecker Brothers albums
GRP Records albums